The 1973–74 UCLA Bruins men's basketball team would be Bill Walton's final year with the school. During the season, the Bruins' 88 game winning streak would end. The defeat was a 71–70 loss to the University of Notre Dame Fighting Irish. Coincidentally, the Bruins' last loss was to Notre Dame and Austin Carr in 1971 by a score of 89–82.

In the postseason, UCLA's record streak of seven consecutive national titles was broken. North Carolina State defeated the Bruins 80–77 in double overtime in the Final Four.

Pre-season
The team was ranked as the No. 1 team in the nation by both AP an UPI polls.

Roster

Schedule

|-
!colspan=9 style=|Regular Season

|-
!colspan=12 style="background:#;"| NCAA Tournament

Source

Rankings

Awards and honors
 Bill Walton, USBWA College Player of the Year
 Bill Walton, Naismith College Player of the Year
 Bill Walton, Adolph Rupp Trophy

Team players drafted into the NBA

References

External links

1973–74 UCLA Bruins at Sports-Reference.com

Ucla Bruins
UCLA Bruins men's basketball seasons
NCAA Division I men's basketball tournament Final Four seasons
Ucla
UCLA
UCLA